The First Secretary of the Komi regional branch of the Communist Party of the Soviet Union was the position of highest authority in the Komi AO (1921–1936) and the Komi ASSR (1936–1991) in the Russian SFSR of the Soviet Union. The position was created in January 1921, and abolished in August 1991. The First Secretary was a de facto appointed position usually by the Politburo or the General Secretary himself.

List of First Secretaries of the Komi Communist Party

See also
Komi Autonomous Soviet Socialist Republic

Notes

Sources

1921 establishments in Russia
1991 disestablishments in the Soviet Union
Regional Committees of the Communist Party of the Soviet Union
Politics of the Komi Republic